Dragon Friends is a 2013 mobile game developed by InnoSpark and published by NHN, companies based in Seoul, South Korea. The game was released for Android and iOS platforms on 2013, and serviced through NHN platform. The game is currently discontinued.

Game Contents 
Basically, Dragon Friends is a farming game in which users should plant crops, and nurture characters to develop their towns and earn more diverse characters. Dragons are the main characters of the game, and users can breed, nurture, and evolve Dragons and other characters.

Characters

Dragons 
Dragons, the main character of Dragon Friends are the most important contents of the game and are divided into 7 basic characteristics.
By breeding different types, players can get new types of Dragons:
"Tree", "Land", "Fire", "Lightning", "Ice", "Wind", and "Water".
These 7 characteristics are also divided into 4 levels.

Animals 
Sheep, Puppies, Cats, Cows, Pigs, and Donkeys are animal characters that help users earn money for the gameplay.

Special Characters 
Due to a cross promotion with Sanrio, there are special characters in Dragon Friends, including Hello Kitty, My Melody, Kuromi, and Cinnamoroll. These characters were first released through the special event.

Updates 
Updates of Dragon Friends are consistent and mainly serviced in special days such as Christmas and Valentine's Day. In such days, Dragon Friends provides chances for users to get special characters which can only be taken in a limited event period. The first big update had added the extra islands which allow users to add additional small islands near their mainland. Players freely decorated the main island and it amplified flexibility of the game. Also it added Safe Touch, which protected the user from mistakenly using resources by asking twice for the decision-making.

References

External links
Dragon Friends' official Facebook page
Innospark's official English homepage

Android (operating system) games
IOS games
Video games about dragons
2013 video games
Video games developed in South Korea